The 120 members of the second Knesset were elected on 30 July 1951. The breakdown by party was as follows:
Mapai: 45
General Zionists: 20
Mapam: 15
Hapoel HaMizrachi: 8
Herut: 8
Maki: 5
Progressive Party: 4
Democratic List for Israeli Arabs: 3
Agudat Yisrael: 3
Sephardim and Oriental Communities: 2
Poalei Agudat Yisrael: 2
Mizrachi: 2
Progress and Work: 1
Yemenite Association: 1
Agriculture and Development: 1

List of members

Replacements

External links
Members of the Second Knesset Knesset website

 
02